Monmouth-Roseville High School, or MRHS, is a public four-year high school located at 200 South B Street in Monmouth, Illinois, a city of Warren County, Illinois, in the Midwestern United States. MRHS is part of Monmouth-Roseville Community Unit School District 238, which also includes Monmouth-Roseville Junior High School, Central Intermediate School, Harding Primary School, and Lincoln Early Childhood School. The campus is located in Monmouth, IL, 17 miles west of Galesburg, Illinois, and serves a mixed city, village, and rural residential community. The school is in the Galesburg micropolitan statistical area which includes all of Knox and Warren counties. The school is located less than 1 mile from Monmouth College.

Academics

As of 2009, Monmouth-Roseville High School was under Academic Early Warning Status. In 2009, 58% of students tested met or exceeded state standards. MRHS did not make Adequate Yearly Progress in 2009 on the Prairie State Achievement Examination, a state test that is part of the No Child Left Behind Act. The school's average high school graduation rate between 2006-2009 was 88%.

In 2009 the faculty was 122 teachers, averaging 16.0 years of experience, and of whom 24% held an advanced degree. The average class size was 17.0. The student to faculty ratio was 16.3. The district's instructional expenditure per student was $4,804. School enrollment increased from 510 to 531 (4%) in the period of 2006-2009.

As of the 2020-2021 academic year, Monmouth-Roseville was rated a "Commendable School" by the state. The school's graduation rate in 2019 was 90.2%. The faculty in 2019 was 121 teachers, the average class size was 17.7, and the school's instructional spending per student was $5,946. In 2019, 22.3% of the school tested proficient in ELA, while 16.9% tested proficient in Math.

Athletics

Prior to 2005, Monmouth High School had 9 state championships in team athletics and activities, 8 in Boys' Golf and 1 in Boys' Football. Roseville High School had none.

Since 2005, Monmouth-Roseville High School competes in the West Central Conference and is a member school in the Illinois High School Association. Its mascot is the Titan.

Arts

The school has several choirs and a band. The music department won second place in the Class B IHSA Music Sweepstakes in 2018-19, and first place in 2019-20.

The speech program won regional titles in Speech Individual Events in 2012-13, 2014–15, and 2015–16.

Consolidations
Monmouth High School consolidated with Roseville High School in 2005 to form Monmouth-Roseville High School. The high school for the Monmouth-Roseville School District is located in the original Monmouth High School building. The Roseville High School building became the Monmouth-Roseville Junior High School.

References

External links
 Monmouth-Roseville High School

Public high schools in Illinois
Schools in Warren County, Illinois